Diadora is an Italian sportswear and footwear manufacturing company based in Caerano di San Marco (Veneto), subsidiary of Geox, founded in 1948. Diadora produces football boots and athletic shoes, as well as a range of apparel that includes t-shirts, polo shirts, hoodies, jackets, leggings, shorts, and compression garments. Diadora also commercialises football balls in the US market.

History

Origins and development 
Diadora was founded in 1948 by Marcello Danieli, who first began working in the trade as a young boy. He called his company "Diadora" a name suggested by a friend. The word comes from the name given by the Greeks of Byzantium to the Dalmatian town of Zadar. Originally called "de ladera" or "from Zadar," it was mistakenly copied and translated from Dalmatian to Latin, becoming, along the way "Diadora." Danieli, helped by his wife, managed to successfully launch his first product, mountain climbing boots.

The mid-1970s also marked Diadora's entry into the football category, aided by Roberto Bettega, who provided consulting information. The company also added the tennis market signing endorsement agreements with Björn Borg.

AC Milan striker Marco van Basten became the face of the company in the late 1980s, and launched his own personalized football boots, the San Siro Van Basten. Other high-profile football players under Diadora sponsorship have included George Weah, Roberto Baggio, Giuseppe Signori, Francesco Totti, Roy Keane and Antonio Cassano. While between 1997 and 2000, Diadora was the official kit supplier of A.S. Roma.

The 2000s 

In early 2000's Diadora was the official kit supplier of several Italian football clubs, with the most notable being A.S. Roma, between 2003 and 2007. In 2008, Diadora SpA signed a joint venture with Win Hanverky Holdings Limited, forming a new company called "Winor International Company Limited" that operates the trademark "Diadora" in China, Hong Kong, and Macau to manufacture, design, promote, distribute, and sell products bearing the brand in those countries.

In June 2009, Diadora reached an agreement with Italian shoe-making company Geox's founder and chairman Mario Moretti Polegato to buy its assets through his family's investment arm, LIR.

On September 8, 2020, Geox filed for bankruptcy in Canada.

Since then, Diadora has sponsored several football clubs to provide them team uniforms, such as Norwegian Eliteserien clubs, Viking FK, FK Bodo/Glimt, and I-League side Rangdajied United. In this last season 2021/2022 Diadora Launched in Canada and sponsoring Dynamo de Candiac Club.
From the 2022–2023 season, Diadora become the new technical supplier of Bursaspor and Giresunspor at the Süper Lig, and also Mağusa Türk Gücü in Northern Cyprus KTFF Süper Lig.
Even from the same season Diadora will be present on the Danish 1st Division like supplier of Helsingør and Vendsyssel at the NordicBet Liga. At March 2022 the  n. 10 WTA  Italian player Martina Trevisan has become new brand Ambassador. Diadora in the 2023 become the new technical supplier of Velez Sarsfield in Primera Division in Argentina.

References

External links

 

Geox
Athletic shoe brands
Clothing companies established in 1948
Sporting goods manufacturers of Italy
Italian brands
Sportswear brands
Privately held companies of Italy
Italian companies established in 1948
Shoe brands
Shoe companies of Italy
Companies based in Veneto
1980s fashion
1990s fashion
2000s fashion
2010s fashion
Companies that have filed for bankruptcy in Canada